Badsaddle, Withmale Park and Bush Walk Woods is a  biological Site of Special Scientific Interest north-west of Wellingborough in Northamptonshire.

This is ancient coppice woodland with oak and ash on wet calcareous soils. Ground flora include herb paris, goldilocks buttercup and four species of orchid.

There is access to Bush Park and Withmale Park Woods from Redhouse Road, which runs between them, and to Badsaddle Wood by a track from the A43 road.

References

Sites of Special Scientific Interest in Northamptonshire